Tom ("Thomas") Nyariki (born September 27, 1971, in Nyamira) is a long-distance runner from Kenya. Most notably he won a bronze medal on the 5,000 metres at the 1997 World Championships.

Nyariki is married to Jackline Maranga. Nyariki represents the Kisii tribe from Nyanza.

He trains with Kimbia Athletics and is coached by Dieter Hogen. Recently he has competed mostly in road running races in the USA.

Achievements 
1998 IAAF World Cup - bronze medal (3000 m)
1998 IAAF World Cross Country Championships - fourth place 
1997 IAAF Grand Prix Final - silver medal (5000 m) 
1997 World Championships in Athletics - bronze medal (5000 m)
1997 IAAF World Cross Country Championships - third place

Personal bests
3000 metres - 7:27.75 (1996)
5000 metres - 12:55.94 (1997)
10,000 metres - 27:48.12 (2002)
10 kilometres - 27:30 (2001)
5 kilometres - 13:24 (2001)
5 miles road - 22:32 (1999)
marathon - 2:15:58 (2006)

External links

KImbia Athletics

1971 births
Living people
Kenyan male long-distance runners
Athletes (track and field) at the 1998 Commonwealth Games
Athletes (track and field) at the 1996 Summer Olympics
Olympic athletes of Kenya
World Athletics Championships medalists
Commonwealth Games medallists in athletics
Commonwealth Games silver medallists for Kenya
African Games bronze medalists for Kenya
African Games medalists in athletics (track and field)
Kenyan male cross country runners
Goodwill Games medalists in athletics
Athletes (track and field) at the 1999 All-Africa Games
Competitors at the 1998 Goodwill Games
Medallists at the 1998 Commonwealth Games